John Andrew Ozburn (January 4, 1913 – February 14, 1969) was an American basketball player who played five seasons in the American National Basketball League (NBL), a precursor to the modern NBA.

Ozburn starred in basketball and track at Monmouth College in Monmouth, Illinois.  Following his college career, he played for the Kansas City Santa Fe Trails of the Amateur Athletic Union (AAU), where he was named an AAU All-American in 1936. He then moved to the NBL, where he played four seasons for the Akron Firestone Non-Skids from 1937 to 1941, winning league titles in 1939 and 1940. He played one final NBL season for the Toledo Jeeps.

References

External links
NBL stats at basketball-reference.com

1913 births
1969 deaths
Akron Firestone Non-Skids players
Amateur Athletic Union men's basketball players
American men's basketball players
Basketball players from Illinois
Forwards (basketball)
Guards (basketball)
Monmouth Fighting Scots men's basketball players
People from Jackson County, Illinois
Toledo Jim White Chevrolets players